The 1988 United States Senate election in New Jersey was held on November 8, 1988. Incumbent Democratic U.S. Senator Frank Lautenberg won re-election to a second term with a margin of 8.37%.

Background

Businessman Frank Lautenberg was elected in 1982 in a hard-fought, come-from-behind upset victory over U.S. Representative Millicent Fenwick. Given his narrow victory and low name recognition, New Jersey Republicans eagerly targeted his seat as a potential victory. Popular second-term Governor Thomas Kean led the efforts to recruit a challenger.

Democratic primary

Candidates
Frank Lautenberg, incumbent Senator since 1983
Elnardo J. Webster, former Hudson County Freeholder
Harold J. Young

Campaign
Senator Lautenberg formally launched his re-election campaign in April. He ignored his primary opponents, instead focusing on the general election and Pete Dawkins.

Results

Republican primary

Candidates
Pete Dawkins, financial executive and retired U.S. Army brigadier general

Declined
Leonard S. Coleman Jr., New Jersey Commissioner of Community Affairs

Campaign
In 1987, Governor Thomas Kean recruited Pete Dawkins to move from New York City to Rumson, New Jersey in order to campaign as a Republican for Senate. Kean served as Dawkins's campaign chair. Efforts to recruit Dawkins were paired with efforts to persuade Commissioner of Community Affairs Leonard S. Coleman Jr. against running; Coleman was a personal friend of the Governor and was the early favorite to challenge Lautenberg.

Pete Dawkins announced his campaign on March 1 with the enthusiastic endorsement of Governor Kean. At his campaign announcement, Kean praised Dawkins as "the only West Point cadet in history to be the Captain of Cadets, president of his class, captain of the football team and finish in the top 5 percent of his class, and, by the way, pick up a Heisman Trophy and Rhodes Scholarship on the side." Dawkins pledged support for giving a presidential line-item veto and a "sweeping reform" of the federal budget process, while favoring budget cuts, including cuts to military spending, over tax increases.

On April 19, President Reagan appeared and spoke at a pre-primary fundraising dinner for Dawkins in Washington D.C., where Dawkins presented Reagan with a football signed by many Heisman Trophy winners.

Results
Dawkins was unopposed in the primary.

General election

Candidates
 Pete Dawkins, financial executive and retired U.S. Army brigadier general (Republican)
 Thomas A. Fiske (Socialist Workers)
 Joseph F. Job, Bergen County Sheriff and candidate for U.S. Senate in 1970 (Independent)
 Frank Lautenberg, incumbent U.S. Senator since 1983 (Democratic)
 Jerry Zeldin (Libertarian)

Campaign
With no serious primary threat, Lautenberg and Dawkins targeted each other from early March. Both candidates being political moderates, the campaign quickly turned personal. On the day of Dawkins's campaign announcement, Lautenberg pointed out that he was a lifelong New Jerseyan, while Dawkins had moved to the state to run for Senate. Dawkins responded, "The important thing is not where we were born, but who we are, what our vision for the state is, and how we intend to act in the United States Senate." Lautenberg's carpetbagging accusation was a theme throughout the campaign. Dawkins aimed to tie himself to the popular Governor Kean, while Lautenberg leaned on his relationship with New Jersey's more popular senior Senator, Bill Bradley.

The campaign was full of political mudslinging. In addition to his carpetbagging accusation, Lautenberg's campaign also accused Dawkins's of lying about his war record. Dawkins accused Lautenberg of running a smear campaign, called him a "swamp dog", and criticized him for saying he voted eight times against a senatorial pay raise without mentioning the fact that he did vote once for the pay raise.

Paul Begala and James Carville consulted for the Lautenberg campaign, while Roger Stone consulted for Dawkins. Stone called Dawkins “the biggest thing to hit New Jersey since Bill Bradley.”

Polling

Results

If Dawkins had been elected, New Jersey would have become the only state represented by two Rhodes Scholars in the Senate.

By county

See also 
 1988 United States Senate elections

References 

1988
New J
1988 New Jersey elections